Abdullah Majrashi (born 21 August 1990) is a Saudi football player who plays as a left back.

References

1990 births
Living people
Saudi Arabian footballers
Ittihad FC players
Hetten FC players
Damac FC players
Saudi First Division League players
Saudi Professional League players
Place of birth missing (living people)
Association football defenders